The Duff Cooper Prize is a literary prize awarded annually for the best work of history, biography, political science or occasionally poetry, published in English or French. The prize was established in honour of Duff Cooper, a British diplomat, Cabinet member and author. The prize was first awarded in 1956 to Alan Moorehead for his Gallipoli. At present, the winner receives a first edition copy of Duff Cooper's autobiography Old Men Forget and a cheque for £5,000.

Overview
After Duff Cooper's death in 1954, a group of his friends decided to establish a trust to endow a literary prize in his memory. The trust appoints five judges. Two of them are ex officio: the Warden of New College, Oxford, and a member of Duff Cooper's family (initially, Duff Cooper's son, John Julius Norwich for the first thirty-six years, and then John Julius' daughter, Artemis Cooper). The other three judges appointed by the trust serve for five years and they appoint their own successors. The first three judges were Maurice Bowra, Cyril Connolly and Raymond Mortimer. At present, the three appointed judges are biographer Mark Amory, historian Susan Brigden, and TLS history editor David Horspool.

From 2013, the prize has been known as The Pol Roger Duff Cooper Prize, following a sponsorship by Pol Roger.

Winners

See also

 List of history awards
 Prizes named after people

Notes

External links 
The Duff Cooper Prize

British literary awards
British poetry awards
Awards established in 1956
1956 establishments in the United Kingdom
History awards
Political book awards
Biography awards
British non-fiction literary awards